Rob Waring (born December 3, 1956 in Yonkers, New York) is an American-Norwegian Contemporary music composer and performer (drums and vibraphone), commonly associated with symphony orchestras and jazz ensembles.

Career 
Waring studied with Roland Kohloff, who had just become timpanist of the New York Philharmonic, while still in high school. Then he continued studies on percussion at the Juilliard School with Saul Goodman and Elden "Buster" Bailey (1974–79), and earned his Bachelor and Master of Music Degrees. During that period, he also took elective courses in composition with Stanley Wolfe, and studied jazz vibraphone in 1975 with Dave Samuels. He started a career as a freelance musician in New York, and worked in symphony orchestras, jazz groups, ensembles for new music, and an experimental ensemble for homemade instruments.

In 1981, Waring moved to Oslo and since then has participated on numerous recordings and established the Rob Waring Trio with Frank Jakobsen and Carl Morten Iversen (1987–).  He teaches at Norges Musikkhøgskole, and has played in bands like Søyr and contributed on releases by Erik Wøllo (1983), Espen Rud (1984), Torgrim Sollid (1983), Rune Klakegg, Tone Hulbækmo (1986), Arve Moen Bergset (1987), Kjell Samkopf (1987), Morten Halle (1988), Lasse Thoresen (1994), Peter Opsvik (1999), Lars Klevstrand (2000), Torbjørn Sunde oktett (2001), Elin Rosseland (2004), SKRUK (2004), and on the Jon Larsen records Strange News From Mars (2007) and The Jimmy Carl Black Story (2008). At the Vossajazz 2014, Waring joined Mats Eilertsen's Rubicon, for the commissioned work.

Works (in selection) 

1984: Concerto for Vibraphone and Chamber orchestra
1996: Sonomatrix, electronic installation at the Henie-Onstad Art Center in Bærum, Norway
1997: Sikoté Sukán, for percussion trio
2003: Sax Cycles, for 2 saxophones and electronics
2005: Jalan Pantai Sari, quartertone-marimba duet
2006: Braided Streams, for viola, contrabass and marimba
2009: Frekoté Vokán, guitar duet
2011: Wellspring, guitar trio
2011: Three Narratives for Solo Harp
2013: Point of Departure, duet for vibraphone and marimba

Discography (in selection)

Solo albums 
Rob Waring Trio
1992: Secret Red Thread (Odin)
2001: Synchronize Your Watches (Resonant)

Collaborations 
Trio with Jan Wiese and Erik Wøllo
1984: Wiese – Wøllo – Waring Trio (Maza)

With Octoband
1986: Octoband (Aurora), including with Guttorm Kittelsen, Aasmund Feidje, Kjell Samkopf, Andreas Rønningen, Morten Gunnar Larsen and Bjørn Kjellemyr

With Søyr
1988: Vectors (Hot Club)
2001: Alene Hjemme (Curling Legs)

With Metropolitan
1999: Metropolitan (Columbia)
2004: Love Is Blind (Curling Legs)

With Torbjørn Sunde Octet
2001: Where Is the Chet (Kirkelig Kulturverksted)

With Elin Rosseland
2004: Moment (NorCD)
2007: Elin Rosseland Trio (NorCD)

With Jon Eberson Trio
2009: Born to Be Slow (NorCD)

With Stian Omenås
2012: Klangkammer 1 (NorCD)

With John Surman
Invisible Threads (ECM, 2018)

References

External links 

Rob Waring: American Composer in Norway on YouTube

Norwegian jazz composers
Norwegian jazz vibraphonists
Norwegian jazz drummers
Male drummers
People from Yonkers, New York
1956 births
Living people
Resonant Music artists
Odin Records artists
20th-century Norwegian drummers
21st-century Norwegian drummers
Male jazz composers
20th-century Norwegian male musicians
21st-century Norwegian male musicians
Søyr members